Thomas McKinney (31 December 1926 – 10 November 1999) was an Irish rugby union and professional rugby league footballer who played in the 1940s and 1950s.

Background
Tom McKinney was born in Ballymena, Ireland.

Playing career

International honours
Tom McKinney represented Combined Nationalities, and scored a try in the 15–19 defeat by France at Stade de Gerland, Lyon on Sunday 3 January 1954, won 7(8?)-caps for Other Nationalities (RL), represented British Empire XIII (RL) while at Salford in 1952 against New Zealand, represented Rugby League XIII while at Salford in 1954 against France, and won caps for Great Britain while at Salford in 1951 against New Zealand, in 1952 against France (non-test), Australia (2 matches), in 1953 against France (non-test), in 1954 against France (non-test), Australia (3 matches), New Zealand, while at Warrington in 1955 against New Zealand (2 matches), France (non-test), New Zealand, in 1956 against France (non-test), while at St. Helens in the 1957 Rugby League World Cup against New Zealand.

In the 1954 Australasian Tour he was brought out of the scrum by Darcy Lawler, Australia's most controversial referee at the time, and accused of biting. A flabbergasted McKinney just opened his mouth to reveal his toothless gums.

Championship final appearances
Tom McKinney played in Warrington's 7–3 victory over Oldham the Championship Final during the 1954–55 season at Maine Road, Manchester on Saturday 14 May 1955.

County Cup Final appearances
Tom McKinney played  in St. Helens 2–12 defeat by Oldham in the 1958–59 Lancashire County Cup Final during the 1958–59 season at Central Park, Wigan on Saturday 25 October 1958, and played  in the 4–5 defeat by Warrington in the 1959–60 Lancashire County Cup Final during the 1959–60 season at Central Park, Wigan on Saturday 31 October 1959.

Club career
Raised in Scotland, Tom McKinney played rugby union for Jed-Forest RFC, in November 1949 he changed to the rugby league code and transferred to Salford, in January 1955 he transferred to Warrington, on Tuesday 22 January 1957 he transferred to St. Helens for £2000 (based on increases in average earnings, this would be approximately £101,200 in 2013), winning a Championship medal during the 1958–59 season, after Friday 25 December 1959 he transferred to Salford.

Honoured by Rugby League Ireland
On Thursday 25 March 2004 six footballers were inducted into Rugby League Ireland's inaugural Hall of Fame at the Rugby League Heritage Centre in Huddersfield, they were; John "Jack" Daly (Huddersfield/Featherstone Rovers), Robert "Bob" Kelly (Keighley/Wakefield Trinity/Batley), Seamus McCallion (Halifax/Leeds/Bramley), Thomas "Tom" McKinney, (Salford/Warrington/St. Helens), Terry O'Connor (Salford/Wigan Warriors/Widnes Vikings), Patrick "Paddy" Reid (Huddersfield/Halifax).

References

External links
!Great Britain Statistics at englandrl.co.uk (statistics currently missing due to not having appeared for both Great Britain, and England)
(archived by archive.is) U.K. League Hooker in Doubt

1926 births
1999 deaths
British Empire rugby league team players
Combined Nationalities rugby league team players
Great Britain national rugby league team players
Irish rugby league players
Irish rugby union players
Jed-Forest RFC players
Other Nationalities rugby league team players
Rugby league hookers
Rugby league players from County Antrim
Rugby league props
Rugby League XIII players
Salford Red Devils players
Sportspeople from Ballymena
St Helens R.F.C. players
Warrington Wolves players